The year 661 BC was a year of the pre-Julian Roman calendar. In the Roman Empire, it was known as year 93 Ab urbe condita . The denomination 661 BC for this year has been used since the early medieval period, when the Anno Domini calendar era became the prevalent method in Europe for naming years.

Events
 Queen Macha of Ireland begins to rule alone, after the death of her husband Cimbaeth.

Births

Deaths

References